Travis House is a historic home located at Poughkeepsie, Dutchess County, New York. It was built about 1848 and is a -story, three-bay-wide, Greek Revival–style dwelling. It sits on a raised basement and has three eyebrow windows under the molded cornice.

It was added to the National Register of Historic Places in 1982.

References

Houses on the National Register of Historic Places in New York (state)
Greek Revival houses in New York (state)
Houses completed in 1848
Houses in Poughkeepsie, New York
National Register of Historic Places in Poughkeepsie, New York